Philip Glass' Violin Concerto No. 2, titled The American Four Seasons, received its world premiere in Toronto on December 9, 2009, with violinist Robert McDuffie, for whom the work was composed, and the Toronto Symphony Orchestra under conductor Peter Oundjian. Its European premiere was in London on April 17, 2010, with McDuffie and the London Philharmonic Orchestra under conductor Marin Alsop.

Glass composed the work in the summer and autumn of 2009 after several years of exchanges between him and McDuffie with the idea of creating a piece that would serve as a companion to Vivaldi's The Four Seasons. When the work was presented to McDuffie, it emerged that his interpretation of the seasons was somewhat different from Glass'. For this reason, Glass presents this as an opportunity for the listener to make his/her own interpretation. The titles of the movements therefore offer no clues as to where Spring, Summer, Autumn and Winter might fall, with the composer welcoming other interpretations.

Instead of the cadenza typically found in most violin concertos, Glass provided a number of solo pieces for the violinist, which act as a prelude to the first movement, and three "songs" that precede each of the following three movements. Glass also anticipated that these could be played together as separate concert music when abstracted from the whole work.

This concerto is now in the repertoire of the Kremerata Baltica and was played for the first time in San José, Costa Rica with Gidon Kremer as soloist in August, 2013.

Instrumentation
The concerto is scored for solo violin, strings and synthesizer.

References

External links
Compositions, Glass Notes, Recordings; PhilipGlass.com. Accessed: 15 August 2019.

Violin concertos by Philip Glass
Philip Glass albums
2009 compositions